Lee Pulliam (born April 5, 1988) is an American stock car racing driver and team owner. He is a four-time NASCAR Whelen All-American Series Division I national champion, and is the owner of late model racing team Lee Pulliam Performance.

Racing career
After graduating high school early and working as a diesel mechanic while in college to save money, Pulliam purchased his first race car in 2007. He raced his first season at South Boston Speedway and won Rookie of the Year in the Limited Sportsman class; he moved up to the late model class in 2011 and claimed 16 wins at Motor Mile Speedway. He also claimed his first ValleyStar Credit Union 300 win in 2011. A year later, Pulliam claimed his first NASCAR Whelen All-American Series championship. He won a second All-American championship in 2013.

In 2014, Pulliam agreed to a NASCAR K&N Pro Series East effort with Hattori Racing Enterprises. After a crash and two subpar runs, Pulliam was released from the team and progress stalled on making NASCAR Nationwide Series starts with HRE. Another crash in his K&N debut with Top Gun Motorsports stalled plans on the K&N circuit and Pulliam again focused on the All-American late models. Later in 2014, Pulliam claimed his second ValleyStar Credit Union 300 win. At the end of the season, Pulliam claimed the Virginia state and Motor Mile track championships in the All-American Series.

At the beginning of the 2015 season, South Boston named a section of its grandstands for Pulliam; he won a track championship there in 2013. At the Denny Hamlin Short Track Showdown, Pulliam was battling Timothy Peters for the win in the final set of corners when he was spun by Josh Berry, dropping Pulliam to tenth. Afterwards, Pulliam described Berry as "the biggest joke in racing". In the Whelen All-American Series, Pulliam claimed his third national championship that year. A spirited five-race weekend late in the year helped vault Pulliam to the title.

Pulliam mainly competed at Myrtle Beach Speedway in 2017, using that track as the backbone of his fourth All-American Series championship. Trevor Huddleston made a late charge on the championship, but Pulliam stayed ahead in the final point standings. The following year, Pulliam did not chase the All-American championship but instead focused on CARS Tour events. He claimed a win in that series at Bristol Motor Speedway in May.

Before the 2019 season, Pulliam switched chassis from one built around 2010 to a new one acquired in the offseason, and announced his intentions to run for the late model championship at South Boston. and In a race at South Boston, Pulliam and Phillip Morris made contact, resulting in a red flag. Morris' crew chief tried to climb in Pulliam's car, but Pulliam accelerated and ejected the crew member from the car. For the incident, Pulliam was suspended from NASCAR-sanctioned for two weeks, fined $1,500 and placed on probation until the end of the calendar year. During the suspension, Pulliam made a one-off return to the CARS Tour and won the Old State Nationals. Later in the year, Pulliam claimed the Virginia Triple Crown of late model stock car racing, winning the title by one position over Peyton Sellers.

Lee Pulliam Performance
Pulliam is the proprietor of Lee Pulliam Performance, a late model team. LPP has fielded full-time entries in the CARS Late Model Stock Tour, and also at local tracks like Motor Mile Speedway.

Personal life
Pulliam is married with a daughter. He lives in Alton, Virginia.

Motorsports career results

NASCAR
(key) (Bold – Pole position awarded by qualifying time. Italics – Pole position earned by points standings or practice time. * – Most laps led.)

K&N Pro Series East

References

External links
 Lee Pulliam Performance
 

1988 births
People from Caswell County, North Carolina
People from Halifax County, Virginia
Racing drivers from North Carolina
Racing drivers from Virginia
NASCAR drivers
CARS Tour drivers
Living people